The Goliad Formation (Tg) is a geologic formation in Texas. It preserves fossils dating back to the Serravallian to earliest Pliocene stages (Clarendonian, Hemphillian and earliest Blancan in the NALMA classification) of the Neogene period, including the gomphothere Blancotherium among many other fossil mammals, reptiles, birds and fish.

The formation hosts uranium deposits and forms the Evangeline aquifer underneath the city of Houston.

Description 
The formation overlies the Fleming Formation and dates from the Clarendonian to the earliest Blancan. In the southwest of its range, the formation overlies the Catahoula and Gueydan Formations. The Goliad Formation is recognized regionally across the Texas coastal plain as an interval of dominantly fluvial siliciclastic strata that overlies the Miocene Fleming Formation and underlies Pleistocene terrace deposits. The formation is now interpreted as a basinward-thickening progradational wedge of Middle and Late Miocene age.

Together with the Catahoula, Fleming and Oakville Formation, the Goliad Formation is part of the Gulf Coast aquifer, an extensive artesian aquifer that produces water primarily for irrigation and municipalities. The Evangeline aquifer is hosted by the Goliad Formation underlying the city of Houston. The formation hosts uranium deposits in the South Texas Uranium Province and is mined for caliche in Hidalgo County, Texas.

Fossil content 
Tertiary mammal fossils from South Texas were first reported by Dumble (1894) as coming from the Lapara division, later the Lapara Beds (Dumble, 1903).

The following fossils have been reported from the formation:

See also 
 List of fossiliferous stratigraphic units in Texas
 Paleontology in Texas

References

Bibliography 

Geology
 
 
 
 

Paleontology

Further reading 

 Weeks, A. W., 1945, Oakville, Cuero, and Goliad formations of Texas Coastal Plain between Brazos River and Rio Grande: American Association of Petroleum Geologists Bulletin, v. 29, p. 1721–1732
 E. H. Sellards. 1941. Final report covering the period from March 4, 1939 to September 30, 1941 for the state-wide paleontologic-mineralogic survey in Texas. A Federal Works Agency Work Projects Administration Project iii-85
 Anonymous. 1941. The ninth quarterly report covering the quarter ending June 30, 1941 for the state-wide paleontologic-mineralogic survey in Texas. A Federal Works Agency Work Projects Administration Project. O.P. No. 665-66-3-233. State Serial No. 300-88 1-41
 Anonymous. 1940. The seventh quarterly report covering the quarter ending December 31, 1940 for the state-wide paleontologic-mineralogic survey in Texas. A Federal Works Agency Work Projects Administration Project. O.P. No. 665-66-3-233. State Serial No. 300-88 1-44
 Anonymous. 1940. The sixth quarterly report covering the quarter ending September 30, 1940 for the state-wide paleontologic-mineralogic survey in Texas. A Federal Works Agency Work Projects Administration Project. O.P. No. 665-66-3-233. State Serial No. 300-88 1-44
 Anonymous. 1939. The second quarterly report covering the quarter ending September 30,1939 for the state-wide paleontologic-mineralogic survey in Texas. A Federal Works Agency Work Projects Administration Project. O.P. No. 665-66-3-233. State Serial No. 300-88 1-26
 Anonymous. 1939. The first quarterly report covering the quarter ending June 30,1939 for the state-wide paleontologic-mineralogic survey in Texas. A Federal Works Agency Work Projects Administration Project. O.P. No. 665-66-3-233. State Serial No. 300-88 1-22+

Geologic formations of Texas
Miocene Series of North America
Pliocene Series of North America
Neogene geology of Texas
Serravallian
Tortonian
Messinian
Clarendonian
Hemphillian
Blancan
Sandstone formations of the United States
Shale formations of the United States
Fluvial deposits
Fossiliferous stratigraphic units of North America
Paleontology in Texas
Formations
Formations
Formations
Formations